Boy Meets Girl is an American pop-music duo consisting of keyboardist and vocalist George Merrill and singer Shannon Rubicam. They are perhaps best known for their hit song "Waiting for a Star to Fall" from 1988 and for writing two of Whitney Houston's number one hits: "How Will I Know" and "I Wanna Dance with Somebody (Who Loves Me)".

Career
The members of Boy Meets Girl, George Merrill and Shannon Rubicam, wrote and composed a number of songs for other artists. Most famous are their two number one hits written for Whitney Houston, "How Will I Know" and "I Wanna Dance with Somebody (Who Loves Me)". They also wrote the songs "Don't Tell Me We Have Nothing" and "Haunting Me" for Deniece Williams and the song "I Know You By Heart", which was recorded by Dolly Parton and Smokey Robinson for Parton's 1987 Rainbow album, and later covered by Bette Midler for the Beaches soundtrack. The duo also performed backing vocals on Deniece Williams's number one hit, "Let's Hear It for the Boy". Merrill also sang backing vocals on Bette Midler's Some People's Lives album.

Boy Meets Girl usually produced a demo version, or, in some cases such as "Don't Tell Me We Have Nothing", a studio version, before Merrill and Rubicam handed the songs to the intended artists.

The duo's first album as a recording act was self titled, and its lead-off song, "Oh Girl", a bitter tale of a failed relationship was released as a single by A&M Records. The song reached number 39 on the Billboard Hot 100 singles chart in May 1985. The Boy Meets Girl album peaked at number 76 on the album chart.

Three years later, the group released its follow-up album, Reel Life, which featured the single "Waiting for a Star to Fall".  With this selection, after years of writing and composing songs for other artists, the duo earned mainstream success in their own right. In the United States, "Waiting for a Star to Fall" peaked at number 5 on the Billboard Hot 100 and at number 1 on the Billboard Adult Contemporary chart. The song reached number 9 in the UK Singles Chart and was also a top 40 Australian hit in April 1989. It was featured in the 1990 movie Three Men and a Little Lady. Reportedly, the song was inspired by an actual falling star that Merrill and Rubicam had seen at one of Whitney Houston's concerts at the Greek Theatre. The duo submitted the song to Houston for consideration on her next album, but her producer at the time, Clive Davis, rejected it.

Boy Meets Girl's follow-up single "Bring Down the Moon" peaked at No. 49 on the Billboard Hot 100 (and No. 28 Adult Contemporary). Reel Life contained both singles and spent several weeks at No. 50 in the United States and peaked at No. 74 in the United Kingdom.

Boy Meets Girl's third album, New Dream, was scheduled for release in 1991, but RCA Records shelved it during a label reorganization. It was finally released and remastered in 2005.

In the early 2000s, the couple, who had married during the 1980s, divorced, but continued their musical collaboration. In 2003, they released their fourth album, The Wonderground, on their own label, and arranged for RCA Records to re-release their two RCA albums. Their debut album recorded for A&M Records was also re-released. In the works are new versions of the demonstration tapes they originally recorded for Whitney Houston. The various artists album Number One With a Bullet also contains their original demo tape for "I Wanna Dance with Somebody (Who Loves Me)".

In 2005, "Waiting for a Star to Fall" was involved in a "sample battle". Two electronic music groups, Cabin Crew and Sunset Strippers, wanted to sample the song and remix it. Sunset Strippers, from the UK, won the right for the samples from the band's record label, releasing "Falling Stars". However, Cabin Crew, from Australia, and vocalist George Merrill re-recorded the vocals for the remixed song, entitled "Star to Fall" or "Star2Fall". A year earlier, Scottish electronic musician Mylo had also used samples of the song, mixing it with Kim Carnes's cover of "Bette Davis Eyes", for his song entitled "In My Arms".

In January 2021, the duo released "More Deeply (In Love with You)", the first single from their forthcoming EP 5.

Discography

Albums and EPs

Singles

References

External links
 
 Boy Meets Girl official site
 
 RockUnited interview: Waiting for a Star to Fall

American pop music duos
Musical groups from Seattle
Musical groups established in 1982
1982 establishments in Washington (state)
Male–female musical duos
Married couples